Shaban Mustafë Kastrati (1871 – 21 February 1945), known as Shaban Polluzha, was a Kosovo Albanian military leader active in Drenica during World War II. He was a collaborationist, serving in the Royal Albanian gendarmerie and as a commander of the Vulnetari militia. He was briefly a member of the Balli Kombëtar. He was killed by the Yugoslav Partisans.

Early life
Shaban was born in Polluzha, in the Drenica region (now central Kosovo). He comes from a middle-class family and he was not educated, but as a young man he became involved in political life, which was imposed on him by the circumstances and injustices of the occupying regimes.

World War I and II
He fought against the Bulgarians and Austrians during the First World War, afterwards he fought for the Kaçak movement against the Kingdom of Yugoslavia. In 1924 he was part of a unit led by Azem Galica, and he covered their retreat to Albanian territory after Galica had been wounded.

Shaban Polluzha was one of the most famous commanders of the Drenica area during the Second World War. During the Second World War, he was also the commander of a part of the front in Montenegro, Kolašin and Sandžak, where he was distinguished for organization and strategy. He was a member of the Islihat Council (peace court) and on the proposal of Miftar Bajraktari he was appointed chairman of the Islihat in Drenica.

In 1941, Shaban Polluzha along with his family was imprisoned in Peje because he opposed cooperation with the Italians. Initially, Polluzha was associated with Balli Kombëtar, and during the war he maintained close ties with the anti-fascist National Liberation Movement (Albania) and Yugoslav Partisans, believing their promise that Kosovo would be given self-determination. Around December 1944, attempts were made to forcefully mobilize Kosovo Albanians into the Yugoslav Army. Shaban Polluzha became commander of the Drenica Brigade which was founded in December 1944 to support the Sixth Albanian Brigade.

On October 7 Shaban Polluzha with 60 of his men came to Novi Pazar to aid the forces of the town's collaborationist mayor Aćif Hadžiahmetović, who had ambitions to incorporate Novi Pazar into Greater Albania. During Battle of Novi Pazar, Polluzha was blamed by the city's defense committee their failure of counter-offensive on Raška, as his men were 'only interested in plundering'. He left the city on December 19. He was later arrested in Mitrovica, and his loot was confiscated. 

After talks with Fadil Hoxha in late 1944, the brigade was to follow the orders of the Yugoslav command and go north to the front in Syrmia. However, Polluzha was very hesitant and rejected the order, saying that he wanted to stay in Kosovo and defend his home region of Drenica against attacks on Albanians by Chetnik groups.  His force (roughly 8,000 men) was then attacked by Yugoslav Partisan units in January 1945. It has been estimated that more than 20,000 local Albanians joined Polluzha, the leader of the Anti-Yugoslav uprising; fighting in Drenica continued until March, and (mainly Serbian) soldiers destroyed forty-four villages there. Shaban Polluzha died in Tërstenik on 21 February 1945. Another uprising of Albanians who refused to leave Kosovo broke out in Mitrovica in February 1945. Yugoslav military operations proceeded with the destruction of the Drenica brigade; by March the revolt was crushed and thousands of Albanians (soldiers and civilians) were killed.

Remains of the Seventh Brigade as well as new recruits, who were recruited deceitfully by telling them that they were to be sent to Albania because Hoxha had called them, were gathered in military barracks in Prizren, disarmed and found themselves made prisoners there; this "was the starting point of the saga which became known as the Bar Tragedy" (see Bar massacre).

Legacy
He was posthumously awarded as "Hero of Kosovo" by the Prime Minister of the Republic of Kosovo, Hashim Thaçi in 2012.

References

Sources

Malcolm, Noel. "Kosovo." A short history, London (1998).

Roszkowski, W., & Kofman, J. (2016). Biographical dictionary of Central and Eastern Europe in the twentieth century. Routledge, p. 793 - 794.
 
 Azizi, Ismet.(2022) Aćif ef. Hadžiahmetović-Bljuta: Velikan Sandžaka, Fondacion"Memorijalni centar Handžet", Novi Pazar Faqet 516,:ISBN 978-86-904604-0-3

Notes

1871 births
1945 deaths
Kosovo Albanians
Albanian soldiers
Executed Albanian people
Drenas
Yugoslav Partisans members
Albanian military personnel of World War I
People killed by Yugoslav Partisans
Albanian nationalists
People from Drenas
Albanian collaborators with Nazi Germany
Modern history of Kosovo

sq:Miftar Bajraktari